Potentilla crantzii, the alpine cinquefoil, is a flowering plant in the family Rosaceae. It is native to North America.

References

crantzii
Flora of Canada
Flora of Alberta
Flora without expected TNC conservation status